Yerecoin is a small town located in the Wheatbelt region of Western Australia, in the Shire of Victoria Plains, north-northeast of the state capital, Perth.

The surrounding areas produce wheat and other cereal crops. The town is a receival site for the CBH Group.

History
Yerecoin was the Aboriginal name for a nearby well, first recorded by a surveyor in 1879. It was first established as a railway station on a new line north from Toodyay, which was approved in 1914 and was extended from Bolgart to Calingiri in 1917 and further to Piawaning (10 km north of Yerecoin) in 1919. The surrounding land was owned by the Midland Railway Company, and was not subdivided by the company until 1925. The company also set aside  for a townsite at Yerecoin, but the land was sold to one owner, and development of the townsite area was slow. A school was opened in 1927, and was followed by other community buildings. The town was gazetted in 1966.

References

See also
 Earthquakes in Western Australia
 South West Seismic Zone

Towns in Western Australia
Grain receival points of Western Australia
Shire of Victoria Plains